The women's basketball team of Beroe is headquartered Stara Zagora in Bulgaria. The team was established in the 1980s. From 1995 - 2004 year the team was eliminated from professional basketball and instead won the Bulgarian Women's Championship. The biggest successes of WBC Beroe is winning the state championship in 1990 and 1992. During the 2016-2017 season the team reached final of the WABA League.

Successes
 Bulgarian Women's Basketball Championship:
  (4): 1990, 1992, 2021, 2022
  (6): 1991, 1995, 2006, 2016, 2018, 2019
  (4): 2005, 2007, 2008, 2017

 Bulgarian Women's Basketball Super Cup:
 (1): 2018

 Bulgarian Women's Basketball Cup:
  (3): 2020, 2021, 2022
  (5): 2004, 2006, 2016, 2018, 2019
  (4): 2001, 2005, 2007, 2017

 WABA League:
  (2): 2019, 2021
  (1): 2017

References
BFB
BG Basket

Beroe
Sport in Stara Zagora